Howard House may refer to:

Person
Howard P. House (1908–2003), American physician

Places in the United Kingdom
 Howard House, Stepney, model dwellings built by the Metropolitan Association for Improving the Dwellings of the Industrious Classes
 Howard House, Bedford, the property where John Howard (prison reformer) stayed.

Places in the United States
(by state then city)
 John W. Howard House and Outbuildings, Greenville, Alabama, listed on the NRHP in Butler County
 Howard Home, Jeffersonville, Indiana, NRHP-listed
 Frank Howard House, Atchison, Kansas, listed on the NRHP in Atchison County
 Howard-Hardy House, Louisville, Kentucky, listed on the NRHP in downtown Louisville
 Howard-Gettys House, Louisville, Kentucky, listed on the NRHP in Jefferson County
George Howard House, Baltimore, Maryland, a Baltimore City Landmark
 Horatio N. Howard House, Pontiac, Michigan, listed on the NRHP in Oakland County
 Howard Homestead, Duanesburg, New York, listed on the NRHP in Schenectady County
 Howard Mansion and Carriage House, Hyde Park, New York, NRHP-listed
Howard House (East New York), New York, New York, a former hotel and railroad depot
 Kenneth L. Howard House, Dunn, North Carolina, listed on the NRHP in Harnett County
 Howard-Royal House, Salemburg, North Carolina, listed on the NRHP in Sampson County
 C.R. Howard House, Aurora, Ohio, listed on the NRHP in Portage County
 Adam Howard House, Galion, Ohio, listed on the NRHP in Crawford County
 Howard House (Seattle), Seattle, Oregon, an art gallery
 Kincaid-Howard House, Fincastle, Tennessee, listed on the NRHP in Campbell County
 McNutt-Howard House, Maryville, Tennessee, listed on the NRHP in Blount County
 Robert E. Howard House, Cross Plains, Texas, listed on the NRHP in Callahan County
 Howard House (Palestine, Texas), NRHP-listed, in Anderson County
 Hill-Howard House, Victoria, Texas, listed on the NRHP in Victoria County
 Howard-Bell-Feather House, Riner, Virginia, listed on the NRHP in Montgomery County
 A. E. Howard House, Yakima, Washington, listed on the NRHP in Yakima County
 Gen. Oliver Otis Howard House, Washington, D.C., listed on the NRHP in Washington, D.C.